The Battle of Rio de Janeiro was a naval battle between France and Portugal that took place in September 1711 during the War of Spanish Succession.

Battle of Rio de Janeiro may also refer to:

 Battle of Rio de Janeiro (1558), 1558 battle between France and Portugal in Henriville (France Antarctique)
 Battle of Rio de Janeiro (1567), or the Battle of Guanabara Bay, 1567 battle between France and Portugal that ended the French colony France Antarctique in modern-day Rio de Janeiro
 Battle of Rio de Janeiro (1710), 1710 naval battle between France and Portugal that took place during the War of Spanish Succession.

See also
 France–Portugal relations